Ṣaʽīdi Arabic (autonym:), or Upper Egyptian Arabic, is a variety of Arabic spoken by the Upper Egyptians in the area that is South/Upper Egypt, a strip of land on both sides of the Nile that extends from Aswan and downriver (northwards) to Lower Egypt. It shares linguistic features with Egyptian Arabic, modern standard, and the Classical Arabic of the Quran. Dialects include Middle and Upper Egyptian Arabic.

Speakers of Egyptian Arabic do not always understand more conservative varieties of Ṣaʽīdi Arabic.

Ṣaʽīdi Arabic carries little prestige nationally, but it continues to be widely spoken in the South, and in the north by Southern migrants who have also adapted to Egyptian Arabic.

Saidi Arabic has various sub-dialects and varies widely from a town to town. Because of the tribal nature of Upper Egypt, and because some of the Upper Egyptian tribes have had links to the formal Arabic language with its proper pronunciations, or the classical Arabic language could be vividly noticed in many sub-dialects. For example, the word "قعمز" meaning "sit", is used throughout Egypt, Sudan, and the Maghreb, and continues to be widely used in Upper Egypt. Furthermore, in addition to similar pronunciation of letters with Hejazi cities such as Jeddah and Mecca, words such as "لسع" meaning "still" and "قمرية" meaning "wild pigeon" are in wide use in Upper Egypt. Other examples are classical words such as "فروج" meaning "chicken", as opposed to "فرخة" that is used in Northern Egypt.

Second- and third-generation Ṣaʽīdi migrants are monolingual in Egyptian Arabic but maintain cultural and family ties to the south.

The Egyptian poet Abdel Rahman el-Abnudi wrote in his native Sa'idi dialect and was the voice of the 2011 Egyptian Revolution and a prominent Egyptian Nationalist.

Dialects 
Behnstedt and Woidich classify the dialects of Upper Egypt into four broad groupings:

 Upper Egyptian 1 — dialects spoken south of Asyut to the region of Luxor. The niktib-níkitbu paradigm is dominant in this group.
 Upper Egyptian 2 — dialects spoken in the bend of the Nile from Nag Hammadi to south of Qena, which have some typical Upper Egyptian features (glottalization of /ṭ/, breaking of /ē/ and /ō/, /d/ for Ǧīm, and the aktib-niktibu paradigm of the imperfect) but which have a syllable structure akin to Middle Egyptian dialects.
 Upper Egyptian 3 — dialects spoken on the west bank of the Nile from el-Bi’irat (near Luxor) to Esna. They are characterized by a form of umlaut, the gahawa-syndrome, the plural suffix -aw in the perfect and imperfect conjugation, and feminine plural pronouns/conjugations. These features indicate strong Bedouin influence.
 Upper Egyptian 4 — dialects spoken south of Luxor, characterized by a ‘pure’ pronunciation of /ā/, and the presence of /a/ in the definite article, as well as some pronouns. Ǧīm is realized [ɟ]. In the north of the region, aktib-niktib or aktib-nikitbu paradigm is used, in the south niktib-nikitbu.

Phonology

Consonants
Ṣaʽīdi Arabic has the following consonants:

Vowels

See also
 Varieties of Arabic
 Sa'idi people
 Copts
 Nubians
 Egyptian Arabic

References

Sources
 Khalafallah, Abdelghany A. 1969. A Descriptive Grammar of Sa'i:di Egyptian Colloquial Arabic. Janua Linguarum, Series Practica 32. The Hague: Mouton.

External links

Languages of Africa
Arabic languages
Languages of Egypt
Upper Egypt